Pavlovce is a village and municipality in Vranov nad Topľou District in the Prešov Region of eastern Slovakia.

History
In historical records the village was first mentioned in 1359.

Geography
The village lies at an altitude of 300 metres and covers an area of 17.573 km².
It has a population of about 716 people.

Ethnicity
The population is 97% Slovak in ethnicity.

Government
The village relies on the tax and district offices, and fire brigade at Michalovce and relies on the police force and birth registry at Trhovište.

Economy

Sports

Transport
The village has a railway station.

References

External links
 
 
https://web.archive.org/web/20080111223415/http://www.statistics.sk/mosmis/eng/run.html 

Villages and municipalities in Vranov nad Topľou District
Šariš